The National Institute of Public Administration (Malay: Institut Tadbiran Awam Negara) or popularly known as INTAN is a Malaysian government agency responsible for the training of civil servants in management and administration.

Background
INTAN was established in 1959 as the 'Training Centre for Civil Servants', which was situated in Port Dickson. The prime objective of the centre was to train civil servants with the necessary knowledge and expertise to face the development challenges of the nation, especially after Independence. In 1963, the Training Centre was relocated to Jalan Ilmu, Petaling Jaya, close to the University of Malaya.

In 1972, the training centre was officially upgraded to an Institute, and is officially known as Institut Tadbiran Awam Negara (INTAN). This change in status coincided with the centre's increasing role and responsibilities under the National Economic Policy (NEP 1971-1990), aimed at socioeconomic development and eradicating poverty in this fledgling nation.

INTAN with the cooperation of the Public Services Department, have played pivotal roles in not only providing civil servants with the necessary facilities and training, but also scholarships, allowances, grants, and so on, for further education and career advancement (Jeong, 2007).

Organisation
INTAN is headed by a Director General, and assists by eight Deputy Directors. Each of the Deputy Director headed a Center. Essentially, there are eight (8) centers under INTAN:

Quality Management
Financial Management
Economic Development and Policy Management
Senior Management and Executive Development
Case Studies Development and Multi-media
Knowledge and Graduate Studies
Information Technology
Language

These eight centers contributed positively to the relevancy of INTAN as a modern-day training center of the government, in providing the staff with the necessary knowledge, skills and expertise, in fulfilling their roles as practical public servants.

Furthermore, courses in INTAN can comprise short-period courses, such as Computer Competency courses (MS Word, Excel, Excess, Basic Internet skills, and so on), to long-term courses, such as Diploma in Public Administration, Diploma in Strategic Studies, Diploma in Foreign Policy, and other short or long courses. Other courses and trainings are provided in areas such as (Jeong, 2007):

Management
Social Development
Policy Development
Agricultural Development
Province and Town Development
Land Administration
Local Government Administration
International Relations
International Trade and Economy
Defense and Security 
Office Administration

Seminars, conferences, and workshops are also held from time to time, to update civil servants, which includes top civil officers, with the necessary knowledge, skills, and expertise, and also as a medium to exchange knowledge and expertise, to face the challenges and needs of modern public administration.

Office and Branch Regions

Headquarters
Bukit Kiara, Kuala Lumpur (Headquarters).

Branch Regions
Jalan Ilmu, Petaling Jaya, close to the University of Malaya (central region) 
Sungai Petani, Kedah (northern region) 
Chukai, Terengganu (East Coast region)
Kluang, Johor (southern region)
Kota Samarahan, Sarawak (Sarawak region)
Kota Kinabalu, Sabah (Sabah region)

External links

References
Jeong Chun Hai @Ibrahim, & Nor Fadzlina Nawi. (2007). Principles of Public Administration: An Introduction. Kuala Lumpur: Karisma Publications.
Jeong Chun Hai @Ibrahim. (2007). Fundamental of Development Administration. Selangor: Scholar Press. 

Federal ministries, departments and agencies of Malaysia
Prime Minister's Department (Malaysia)
Government agencies established in 1972
1972 establishments in Malaysia
Public administration schools
Leadership training
Career and technical education